Mizoram Secular Force (MSF) was a political alliance in Mizoram, launched ahead of the 2004 Lok Sabha elections. MSF comprised Indian National Congress, Mizoram People's Conference and Zoram Nationalist Party. In the elections, MSF had a joint candidate for the sole Mizoram (Lok Sabha constituency), Laltluangliana Khiangte. Khiangte lost the seat with  votes (45.67% of the votes in the state). Khiangte won in 9 out of 40 assembly constituencies making up the Lok Sabha constituency.

The Hmar People's Convention supported the MSF candidate.

References

Political parties in Mizoram
Political parties established in 2004
2004 establishments in Mizoram